Laura Wright is an American author of romance novels.

Biography
Wright was born in Minnesota. As an adult, she pursued a career as an actress, singer and competitive ballroom dancer, teaching ballroom dancing and Latin dancing for more than ten years. After many years of reading romance novels, Wright left dancing and attempted to write romantic fiction. After three years of writing, she sold a manuscript to Harlequin books for their Silhouette Desire line of category romances.

She is married and lives in Los Angeles, California, with her husband and their two children.

Works

Mark of the Vampire
"Eternal Hunger" (Oct 2010) 
"Eternal Kiss" (April 2011) 
"Eternal Blood, E-reader" (Jan 2012) 
"Eternal Captive" (Feb 2012) 
"Eternal Beauty, E-reader" (May 2012) 
"Eternal Beast" (Aug 2012) 
"Eternal Demon" (May 2013) 
"Eternal Sin" (Nov 2013)

Wicked Ink Chronicles
"First Ink, e-reader" (Dec 17, 2013) 
"Shattered Ink, e-reader" (Dec 17, 2013) 
"Rebel Ink, e-reader" (May 26, 2015)

Novels
Hearts Are Wild (2002)
Cinderella and the Playboy (2002)
Baby and the Beast (2002)
Locked Up with a Lawman (2003)
Ruling Passions (2003)
Charming the Prince (2003)
Sleeping with Beauty (2003)
A Bed of Sand (2004)
Lawman (2004)
Redwolf's Woman (2004)
Her Royal Bed (2005)
Savor the Seduction (2005)
The Sultan's Bed (2005)
Millionaire's Calculated Baby Bid (2007)
Playboy's Ruthless Payback (2007)
Rich Man's Vengeful Seduction (2007)

Bayou Heat (with Alexandra Ivy)
Each book in this series has one book written by each author

Raphael/Parish (2013)  
Bayon/Jean-Baptiste (2013) 
Talon/Xavier (2013) 
Sebastian/Aristide (2013) 
Lian/Roch (2014) 
Hakan/Severin (2014) 
Angel/Hiss (2015) 
Rage/Killian (2015) 
Michel/Striker (2015) 
Ice/Reaux (January 18, 2016) 
Kayden/Simon (August 9, 2016)

Short Stories
Bayou Noel [Bayou Heat, Book 3.5] (2013)

Omnibus
Cinderella and the Playboy / Quade – The Irresistible One (2004) (with Bronwyn Jameson)
Plain Jane and the Hotshot / Charming the Prince (2004) (with Meagan McKinney)
The Cowboy Claims His Lady / Sleeping with Beauty (2004) (with Meagan McKinney)
Full Throttle / Ruling Passions (2004) (with Merline Lovelace)
Meeting at Midnight / Bed of Sand (2004) (with Eileen Wilks)
A Tempting Engagement / Redwolf's Woman (2004) (with Bronwyn Jameson)
Mail-order Prince in Her Bed / Hearts are Wild (2004) (with Kathryn Jensen)
Taken by Storm: Whirlwind / Upsurge / Wildfire (2005) (with Kathie DeNosky, Kristi Gold)
Having the Best Man's Baby / Baby and the Beast (2005) (with Shawna Delacorte)
Secrets, Lies... and Passion / Baby and the Beast (2005) (with Linda Conrad)
Entangled with a Texan / Locked Up with a Lawman (2005) (with Sara Orwig)
Sleeping with Beauty / Her Convenient Millionaire (2005) (with Gail Dayton)
Whatever Reilly Wants... / Sultan's Bed (2005) (with Maureen Child)
A Bed Of Sand / Principles and Pleasures (2005) (with Margaret Allison)
Rock Me All Night / Her Royal Bed (2005) (with Katherine Garbera)
Heart of the Raven / Sultans Bed (2006) (with Susan Crosby)
Kept Woman / Her Royal Bed (2006) (with Sheri Whitefeather)
Savour the Seduction / Name Your Price (2006) (with Barbara McCauley)
Dangerous Desires (2007) (with Kathie DeNosky, Kristi Gold)

References

External links
Laura Wright Official website

21st-century American novelists
American romantic fiction writers
American women novelists
Living people
People from Minnesota
21st-century American women writers
21st-century American short story writers
1970 births